Artonish is a ghost town located in Wilkinson County, Mississippi, United States.

Located near the community were the Artonish School, Artonish Plantation, and Artonish Oil Field.  Artonish had a post office from 1890 to 1936.

The population was 51 in 1900.

General Walter Henry Gordon, namesake of the vessel USS General W. H. Gordon, was born in Artonish in 1863.

Nothing remains of the settlement.

References

Former populated places in Wilkinson County, Mississippi
Mississippi populated places on the Mississippi River
Former populated places in Mississippi